Dryden may refer to:

People
 John Dryden (1631–1700), English poet
 Ken Dryden (born 1947), Canadian ice hockey player
 Dryden McKay (born 1997), American ice hockey player
 Dryden (surname)

Fictional
 Mr. Dryden, a character in the film Lawrence of Arabia
 Dryden Fassa, a supporting character in the 1996 anime series The Vision of Escaflowne
 Dryden Vos, antagonist in the 2018 film Solo: A Star Wars Story

Places
 Dryden (crater), a lunar impact crater on the southern hemisphere on the far side of the Moon

In Canada:
 Dryden, Ontario

In the United States:
 Dryden, Michigan
 Dryden Township, Michigan
 Dryden, New York
 Dryden (village), New York
 Dryden, Oregon
 Dryden, Texas
 Dryden, Virginia
 Dryden, Washington
 Dryden Flight Research Center, the former name of the Neil A. Armstrong Flight Research Center, a NASA installation in California